Arndt Johan Norrgård (born 21 May 1942 in Helsinki) is a sailor from Finland. Norrgård represented his country at the 1972 Summer Olympics in Kiel. Norrgård took 12th place in the Soling with Peter Tallberg as helmsman and Johan Tallberg as fellow crew member.

References

Living people
1948 births
Sportspeople from Helsinki
Finnish male sailors (sport)
Sailors at the 1972 Summer Olympics – Soling
Olympic sailors of Finland
Nyländska Jaktklubben sailors